Basant Mohanty (born 4 July  1984) is an Indian cricketer who plays as a medium-pace bowler for Odisha in domestic cricket. He is a right-arm medium-fast bowler and has represented East Zone in Duleep TrophyIndia. He was in the winning team Western Samurai Rourkela in 1st edition of Odisha Premiere League and was in Subarnarekha team in the second season.

He was the leading wicket-taker for Odisha in the 2018–19 Ranji Trophy, with 44 dismissals in eight matches.

References

External links 
 Cricinfo

Indian cricketers
Living people
1986 births
Odisha cricketers
East Zone cricketers
People from Cuttack
Cricketers from Odisha